Manolada is a village and a community in the municipal unit of Vouprasia, Elis, Greece. It is situated in a vast, rural plain near the Ionian Sea, 2 km northwest of Varda, 3 km west of Nea Manolada and 40 km southwest of Patras. In 2011 Manolada had a population of 844 for the village and 1,184 for the community, which includes the small villages Brinia, Karvounaiika, Loutra Yrminis, Mega Pefko and Samaraiika.

History

The area was the site of the Battle of Manolada in 1316, a battle between the Franks and the Catalans over the hegemony over the Principality of Achaea.

2013 shooting of migrant workers in strawberry fields
Manolada's economy is based on farming and is home to many strawberry fields, 
Many migrant workers  work on these farms as Greeks are unwilling or unable to do this work. in 2013, after enduring years of unpaid wages and poor living conditions, an incident broke out on Nikos Vangelatos's farm where migrants protesting their conditions were shot and killed by the overseers. The Greek courts later acquitted the 3 overseers and the owner Nikos Vangelatos from all charges without explanation, The migrants were undocumented workers from Bangladesh and the perpetrators were ethnically Greek. The case is cited as an example of the hostile racism faced by minorities in the EU and Greece and the deception of migrant workers by Europeans.

Population

External links
 Nea Manolada on the GTP Travel Pages

See also

List of settlements in Elis

References

Populated places in Elis
Vouprasia